is the fourth single by Japanese pop singer Yuki Saito. It was ranked #3 on the Oricon charts and #6 on The Best Ten chart.

History
"Jōnetsu" was released on November 15, 1985 as a 7-inch single vinyl record through Canyon Records. The single reached #3 on the Oricon charts,  and #6 on The Best Ten chart. The B-side release was "Sasayaki no Yōsei". Both songs had lyrics written by Takashi Matsumoto, with Kyōhei Tsutsumi composing the songs and Satoshi Takebe arranging them.

The title single was used as the theme song for the 1985 Toho film . Saito starred in the film, which was based on a 1975 novel, Yuki no Danshō, by Marumi Sasaki. It was also used in commercials for the Axia brand of cassette tapes from Fujifilm in Japan.

The original single sold 178,000 copies. It was later rereleased as a mini CD single on April 29, 1988.

Chart history

Track listing

Photo book
A photo book with the same title was released by Ponica Shuppan (through Wani Books) on November 15, 1985. The photographer for the book was Tatsuo Watanabe.

Notes

References

1985 singles
1985 songs
Japanese-language songs
Yuki Saito (actress) songs
Songs with lyrics by Takashi Matsumoto (lyricist)
Songs with music by Kyōhei Tsutsumi
Japanese film songs